The Medical Arts Building is a historic skyscraper at 236 Central Avenue in downtown Hot Springs, Arkansas. It was built in 1929 to a design by Almand & Stuck, and was the tallest building in the state until 1960. 

Its main entrance is framed by fluted pilasters, topped by floral panels and a stone frieze identifying the building.

The building was listed on the National Register of Historic Places in 1978.  Today, all but the first floor is in disrepair and closed to the public. In May 2021 the first 15 floors of the building were purchased and are currently under renovation.

Arkansas First Skyscraper 
ArkansasFirstSkyscraper

References

External links
 Encyclopedia of Arkansas - Medical Arts Building in Hot Springs, AR
 Waymarking - Medical Arts Building in Hot Springs, AR

Hospital buildings on the National Register of Historic Places in Arkansas
Art Deco architecture in Arkansas
Buildings and structures in Hot Springs, Arkansas
Office buildings completed in 1929
National Register of Historic Places in Hot Springs, Arkansas
Skyscrapers in Arkansas